The Best of Richard Marx is the fourth compilation album of Richard Marx released by EMI. This album contains a variety of Marx's popular chart hits.

Track listing 
 "Angelia" (Marx) - 5:18
 "Hazard" (Marx) - 5:17
 "Right Here Waiting" (Marx) - 4:23
 "Hold On To The Nights" (Marx) - 5:14
 "Satisfied" (Marx) - 4:14
 "Keep Coming Back" (Marx) - 6:49
 "Endless Summer Nights" (Marx) - 4:32
 "Now And Forever" (Marx) - 3:34
 "Should've Known Better" (Marx) - 4:12
 "Take This Heart" (Marx) - 4:11

References 

2000 greatest hits albums
Richard Marx albums
Albums produced by Richard Marx